The Sabur Printing Press (SPP) is the exclusive printing company in Eritrea. Its headquarters are located in the national capital, Asmara.

The firm was established in 1997. Its press provides printing services for private individuals, as well as government organizations.

References

Manufacturing companies of Eritrea
Mass media in Eritrea
Printing companies
People's Front for Democracy and Justice
Organisations based in Asmara
1997 establishments in Africa